Elections to South Cambridgeshire District Council were held on Thursday 3 May 2018 as part of the 2018 United Kingdom local elections. Forty five seats, making up the whole of South Cambridgeshire District Council, were up for election in twenty six wards. The council previously had 57 members, last elected by thirds in 2016, 2015 and 2014. Following a boundary review, there has been a reduction of twelve seats to 45 and the electoral pattern has changed from election by thirds to all out elections, meaning that all seats were up for election on this occasion.

In a surprise result, the Liberal Democrats took control of the council, winning 30 seats. The district had been controlled outright by the Conservative Party since the 2007 election.

Summary
The list of candidates was published on 6 April 2018. Both the Conservative Party and the Labour Party fielded a full slate of 45 candidates, while the Liberal Democrats contested 41 seats. The Green Party had 26 candidates, and there were seven independent candidates. The United Kingdom Independence Party stood one candidate in Bar Hill.

There was media speculation in the build-up to the election that the Liberal Democrats could make a surprise breakthrough on the council. The Guardian identified South Cambridgeshire as a district where the Conservative Party's approach to Brexit may damage the party's appeal to "Tory Remain" voters who had predominantly voted to remain in the European Union in the 2016 referendum.

During the campaign, one of the Conservative candidates for the Fen Ditton and Fulbourn ward was suspended from the party after a number of offensive posts he had made on Twitter received national media attention. However he remained on the ballot paper as the deadline for withdrawals had passed.

Results

Results by ward

By-Elections

References

2018 English local elections
2010s in Cambridgeshire
2018